Clark Township may refer to:

Arkansas
 Clark Township, Clay County, Arkansas, in Clay County, Arkansas
 Clark Township, Greene County, Arkansas, in Greene County, Arkansas
 Clark Township, Logan County, Arkansas, in Logan County, Arkansas
 Clark Township, Pike County, Arkansas, in Pike County, Arkansas
 Clark Township, Pope County, Arkansas

Indiana
 Clark Township, Johnson County, Indiana
 Clark Township, Montgomery County, Indiana
 Clark Township, Perry County, Indiana

Iowa
 Clark Township, Tama County, Iowa

Kansas
 Clark Township, Marion County, Kansas

Michigan
 Clark Township, Michigan

Minnesota
 Clark Township, Aitkin County, Minnesota
 Clark Township, Faribault County, Minnesota

Missouri
 Clark Township, Atchison County, Missouri
 Clark Township, Chariton County, Missouri
 Clark Township, Cole County, Missouri
 Clark Township, Lincoln County, Missouri

Nebraska
 Clark Township, Dixon County, Nebraska

New Jersey
 Clark Township, New Jersey

North Dakota
 Clark Township, Hettinger County, North Dakota, in Hettinger County, North Dakota

Ohio
 Clark Township, Brown County, Ohio
 Clark Township, Clinton County, Ohio
 Clark Township, Coshocton County, Ohio
 Clark Township, Holmes County, Ohio

South Dakota
 Clark Township, Douglas County, South Dakota, in Douglas County, South Dakota
 Clark Township, Faulk County, South Dakota, in Faulk County, South Dakota
 Clark Township, Perkins County, South Dakota

Township name disambiguation pages